Valentin Ivanov (born 25 January 1966) is a Bulgarian former wrestler. He competed in the men's freestyle 57 kg at the 1988 Summer Olympics.

References

External links
 

1966 births
Living people
Bulgarian male sport wrestlers
Olympic wrestlers of Bulgaria
Wrestlers at the 1988 Summer Olympics
People from Haskovo
Sportspeople from Haskovo Province